Henry Francis Weatherill (7 October 1893 – 6 July 1960) was an Australian rules footballer who played with Richmond in the Victorian Football League (VFL).

Notes

External links 

1893 births
1960 deaths
Australian rules footballers from Melbourne
Richmond Football Club players
Camberwell Football Club players
Australian military personnel of World War I
People from Hawthorn, Victoria